President for One Day may refer to:
 David Rice Atchison, a 19th-century U.S. Senator best known for the claim that he served as Acting President of the United States on March 4, 1849
 Clímaco Calderón, who served as President of Colombia on December 21, 1882
 Pedro Lascuráin, who served as President of Mexico for less than one hour on February 19, 1913

See also
 King for a Day (disambiguation)